"I'm Not Strong Enough to Say No" is a song written by Robert John "Mutt" Lange and recorded by American country music band  Blackhawk. It was released in July 1995 as the lead-off single  from their album Strong Enough. It peaked at number 2 on the United States Billboard Hot Country Singles & Tracks, while it was their first number-one hit in Canada.

Content
The song's narrator finds himself falling for another man's wife. As they spend time together, he likens being around her to being on "slippery ice", and fears that he may not be able to stop and say no if they continue on their present path.

Critical reception
Deborah Evans Price, of Billboard magazine reviewed the song favorably, saying that Paul's vocal "gives this group a distinctive sound, and this is yet another fine offering from this talented trio."

Music video
The music video was directed by Jim Shea.

Chart performance
"I'm Not Strong Enough to Say No" debuted at number 72 on the Billboard Hot Country Singles & Tracks chart for the week of July 29, 1995, and peaked at number 2 on the week of October 21, 1995, behind Garth Brooks' "She's Every Woman". It reached number 1 on the RPM Country Tracks chart in Canada on the week of November 6, 1995.

Year-end charts

References

1995 singles
1995 songs
Blackhawk (band) songs
Songs written by Robert John "Mutt" Lange
Arista Nashville singles
Song recordings produced by Mark Bright (record producer)